WNAX (570 AM) is a radio station in Yankton, South Dakota, currently owned by Saga Communications, Inc., which broadcasts a news/talk format.

WNAX broadcasts at 5,000 watts around the clock from a tower in eastern Yankton. Due to its location near the bottom of the AM dial, transmitter power, and South Dakota's flat land (with near-perfect ground conductivity) the station's 5,000-watt signal provides at least secondary coverage during the day to most of the eastern half of South Dakota, much of western Iowa, and most of the densely populated portion of Nebraska. In addition to its home markets of Sioux City and Sioux Falls, WNAX provides a strong grade B signal to Omaha and Lincoln. Under the right conditions, its daytime signal penetrates as far south as Kansas City, as far north as Fargo and well east of Des Moines with a good radio. Among U.S. stations its daytime land coverage is exceeded only by KFYR in Bismarck, North Dakota. A single tower is used during the day. Three towers are used at night to protect clear-channel stations on adjacent frequencies, concentrating the signal along the Sioux Falls-Sioux City corridor.

History
WNAX was first licensed on November 7, 1922, to the Dakota Radio Apparatus company, and is the oldest surviving radio station in the state of South Dakota. The call-letters came from a sequentially assigned list, and WNAX was the last station in the state to receive a callsign starting with a W instead of K (other than sister station WNAX-FM), as additional stations in the state were established after the January 1923 shift that moved the K/W call letter boundary from the western border of South Dakota to the Mississippi River. WNAX was purchased by Gurney's Seed and Nursery Company in 1926 and became known as "WNAX—Voice of the House of Gurney in Yankton".  The station was used to promote Gurney products and services, making Gurney's a household name.

On February 10, 1933, the Federal Radio Commission authorized an increase in daytime power from 1,000 watts to 2,500 watts. Less than two years later, December 18, 1934, the new Federal Communications Commission (FCC) authorized another increase in power, to 5,000 watts.

The radio station launched the careers of many stars, both local and national.  Starting in the late 1920s, Lawrence Welk spent a decade performing daily without pay on WNAX.  In 1939, Wynn Hubler Speece started her radio program and became known regionally as "Your Neighbor Lady".  Speece was still continuing to do her Marconi Award-winning broadcast more than sixty years later when WNAX celebrated its eightieth anniversary in 2002. In October 2005 Speece announced her retirement after almost 66 years of continuous broadcasting. She died on October 22, 2007, at 90 years of age. Other well-known regional radio personalities from WNAX have included Norm Hilson, Whitney Larson, "Happy" Jack O'Malley, Bob Hill, Ed Nelson, Jerry Oster, Carl Thoreson, Steve (Mike) Wallick, George B. German, Roland "Pete" Peterson and the hillbilly performers on the WNAX Missouri Valley Barn Dance show.

Gurney's sold WNAX for $200,000 to Gardner Cowles Jr.'s South Dakota Broadcasting Corp. in 1938. The station joined Cowles media holdings that also included The Des Moines Register & Tribune, KSO and KRNT in Des Moines, Iowa, and WMT in Cedar Rapids, Iowa.

In December 1944, the Blue Network announced that WNAX, along with Cowles sister stations KRNT in Des Moines and WCOP in Boston, would be among six new affiliates of the network effective June 15, 1945; the affiliation change would ultimately coincide with the network's rebranding as the American Broadcasting Company (ABC). Prior to this affiliation, WNAX had been a CBS affiliate. Concurrently with the termination of WCOP's ABC affiliation on June 15, 1951, WNAX and KRNT would also leave ABC and rejoin CBS.

In 1957, Cowles Broadcasting Corporation sold the station, along with co-owned television station KVTV (now KCAU-TV) in Sioux City, Iowa, for $3 million to Peoples Broadcasting Corporation, a subsidiary of Nationwide Mutual Insurance Co., which, in turn, was an affiliate of the Ohio Farm Bureau Federation. Peoples sold WNAX to Red Owl Stores for $1.5 million in 1965. Control of Red Owl was acquired by Gamble-Skogmo in 1967; the transfer occurred before seeking FCC approval, and in 1968 the commission ordered Red Owl to sell its stations. WNAX, along with WEBC in Duluth, Minnesota, and KRSI AM-FM in St. Louis Park, Minnesota, was then acquired by Park Broadcasting in a $2.9 million deal announced that July.

In December 1983, a fire destroyed the main WNAX building.  All of the station's historic live recordings as well as thousands of records were destroyed.  The staff of WNAX went to the station's transmitter site and continued broadcasting.  Eventually, the station recovered when a new building was constructed on Highway 50 in Yankton.

Saga Communications purchased WNAX, as well as sister station WNAX-FM, from Park Communications for $7 million in 1996. Programming from One on One Sports was added to WNAX's full service format in January 1997. In 2002, Saga dropped the limited country music played during WNAX's daytime news and farm information programming, and replaced evening carriage of Sporting News Radio (the former One on One Sports) with syndicated talk shows.

Today WNAX continues many of the traditions started in 1922 with frequent news, sports, weather and farm market updates. The station continues to be affiliated with CBS News Radio, an association that began in the late 1920s.

WNAX is the flagship for South Dakota State University sports. WNAX also carries Minnesota Twins baseball and Minnesota Vikings football.

Honors and awards
In May 2006, WNAX won one first place in the commercial radio division of the South Dakota Associated Press Broadcasters Association news contest.

References

External links
WNAX website
WNAX: From 1922 to Today
Article on the eightieth anniversary of WNAX by Minnesota Public Radio.

WNAX 1945 Album - History of WNAX

µWNAX (AM)
Radio stations established in 1922
News and talk radio stations in the United States
Yankton, South Dakota
1922 establishments in South Dakota
Radio stations licensed before 1923 and still broadcasting